Maureen Denise McCormick (born August 5, 1956) is an American actress. She portrayed Marcia Brady on the ABC television sitcom The Brady Bunch, which ran from 1969 to 1974, and reprised the role in several of the numerous Brady Bunch spin-offs and films, including The Brady Kids, The Brady Bunch Hour, The Brady Brides and A Very Brady Christmas (1988). McCormick has appeared in The Amanda Show as Moody's mom in the Moody's Point segment. McCormick also appeared in The Idolmaker (1980) as well as a wide range of other supporting film roles. In the 1980s and 1990s, she ventured into stage acting, appearing in a variety of different roles and productions such as Wendy Darling in Peter Pan and Betty Rizzo in Grease.

McCormick also had a brief career as a recording artist, releasing four studio albums with the Brady Bunch cast as well as touring with them. Her only release as a solo artist to date is a country music album, When You Get a Little Lonely (1995).

Despite professional success on The Brady Bunch and its spin-offs, McCormick struggled in her personal life in the years following the original series' end. Addictions to cocaine and quaaludes, as well as bouts of depression and bulimia, all contributed to McCormick losing her reputation for reliability as an actress. Since the 2000s, she has appeared on several reality television series such as VH1's Celebrity Fit Club, CMT's Gone Country (which led to a short-lived spin-off series led by McCormick, Outsiders Inn) and the Australian version of I'm a Celebrity... Get Me Out of Here!, as well as guest spots on a wide range of television series. In 2008, McCormick published an autobiography, Here's the Story: Surviving Marcia Brady and Finding My True Voice, which debuted at number four on The New York Times bestseller list.

Life and career

1956–1968: Early life and television roles
McCormick was born on August 5, 1956, in the Encino section of Los Angeles, California, to Irene (née Beckman) and Richard McCormick, a teacher. She has three older brothers: Michael, Dennis and Kevin.  She is of Irish and German descent, and was raised in a Catholic family.

At age six, she won the Baby Miss San Fernando Valley beauty pageant. In 1964, she first appeared on national U.S. television, in Mattel commercials for Barbie and Chatty Cathy dolls. Through the later 1960s McCormick appeared in two episodes of Bewitched—-in a Season One dream of Darrin's as one of his witch children named Little Endora, and then in a Season Two Halloween episode as Endora herself transformed into a little girl. She also played guest roles on I Dream of Jeannie, Honey West, The Farmer's Daughter and My Three Sons. In 1970, she lent her voice to a redesigned Chatty Cathy doll. McCormick attended Taft High School in Woodland Hills.

1969–1974: The Brady Bunch

McCormick played the eldest daughter, Marcia, who had five siblings in The Brady Bunch, an American television sitcom about a blended family that aired from late 1969 to early 1974 on ABC, on Friday nights. She had a perky and popular personality. After its cancellation, the series was later rebroadcast in syndication for decades, as children's programming, gathering long-lasting, cross-generational popularity that led to spinoffs and movies. McCormick had a sporadic romance with her Brady Bunch co-star Barry Williams during the original series' run.

McCormick recorded four albums with the Brady Bunch cast and toured with them as well. In 1972, she released her first solo single with the songs "Truckin' Back to You" and "Teeny Weeny Bit (Too Long)". The following year, McCormick recorded an album with her Brady Bunch co-star Christopher Knight, a pop extended play titled Chris Knight and Maureen McCormick, which carried both duets and solo tracks. McCormick's second solo single "Little Bird", backed with "Just a Singin' Alone", had mild chart success in the western United States (reaching Top 5 at KCPX in Salt Lake City). McCormick later performed "Little Bird" on American Bandstand, where host Dick Clark encouraged her to follow a singing career. McCormick released another single in 1973, "Love's in the Roses", backed with "Harmonize".

In 2015, archive footage of McCormick as Marcia was used for an American TV commercial advertising Snickers chocolate bars. The commercial, which debuted during Super Bowl XLIX, features action film star Danny Trejo as young Marcia who (in the context of being hungry) is not acting like herself. After eating a Snickers, Marcia appears as McCormick once again.

1975–2006: Other roles and personal struggles
Following the cancellation of The Brady Bunch, McCormick spent years addicted to cocaine and quaaludes, which impeded her career. McCormick later stated that she sometimes traded sex for drugs during her early 20s. She flubbed an audition with Steven Spielberg for a part in Raiders of the Lost Ark (1981), arriving for the audition under the influence of cocaine and having not slept for three days. She lost her reputation for reliability as an actress in Hollywood, and one producer threatened that she would never work as an actress again. She also dealt with bouts of depression and bulimia.

Despite her struggles with addiction and depression, McCormick did appear in guest roles on numerous television series throughout the 1970s and 1980s, such as Happy Days, Donny & Marie, Love Boat, Vega$, The Streets of San Francisco and Fantasy Island, along with supporting roles in The Idolmaker and B movies such as A Vacation in Hell (1979) and Skatetown, U.S.A. (1979). McCormick later claimed she failed to get a role as a prostitute or heroin dealer for the movie Midnight Express because she continued to be identified with her Brady Bunch role.  She reprised her role as Marcia Brady on the short-lived series The Brady Brides in 1981, which was spun off from the movie The Brady Girls Get Married (1981). McCormick portrayed Wendy Darling in a touring stage production of Peter Pan, beginning in 1983.

McCormick married Michael Cummings on March 16, 1985. Shortly after getting married, McCormick went through a series of interventions, stints in rehab, and experimental therapies. She says that treatment with psychologist Eugene Landy set her back. She began to get sober after marrying, but she still suffered from depression and paranoia, and once threatened to jump from a balcony in front of her husband. She and her husband were at first wary of medication, but McCormick was treated with antidepressant medication such as Prozac beginning in the 1990s. McCormick also said that she was helped by her friendships with former Brady Bunch cast members.

She continued to appear sporadically in films and television projects, having a minor role as a police officer in Return to Horror High (1987), and again reprising her Marcia Brady role for the television film A Very Brady Christmas (1988). McCormick gave birth to her daughter, Natalie Michelle, on May 19, 1989. When The Bradys, a revival of The Brady Bunch, was scheduled to begin production in 1990, McCormick was unavailable to return as Marcia due to her infant daughter, so Leah Ayres filled the role instead. In 1993, the television sitcom Herman's Head episode "When Hermy Met Maureen McCormick" heavily featured her, playing herself. In 1994, McCormick made her Broadway debut as Betty Rizzo in a production of Grease.

McCormick released her debut studio album, When You Get a Little Lonely, on April 4, 1995, as an audio CD and cassette. The album was later made available as a digital download. The album was released under Phantom Hill Records, a record label owned by her brother. McCormick promoted it with live performances in Palmdale, California, and CD signings. When You Get a Little Lonely received negative reviews from music critics, though McCormick's vocals did receive some praise. In a retrospective interview with Entertainment Weekly, McCormick said that she was disappointed by the recording process for the album, and would have preferred to write at least one of her own songs.

In 1997, she portrayed country singer Barbara Mandrell in the television biopic Get to the Heart: The Barbara Mandrell Story. In 2000, McCormick was the first actress to play Rebecca Crane on the soap opera Passions, but she was not put on contract. In 2003, McCormick appeared as herself on an episode of the sitcom Scrubs with references being made to her Marcia Brady character.

2007–present: Reality series and other work

In April 2007, McCormick appeared on Dr. Phil to discuss a family dispute, accusing her brother Kevin of both elder abuse and alienating their father from his other children to gain control of his finances. The same year, McCormick joined the cast of the fifth season of VH1's reality show Celebrity Fit Club, hoping to lose  she had gained since her mother died of cancer and needing to move her disabled brother into an assisted living facility. McCormick lost  and, in June of that year, was the individual winner of the series.

McCormick released her autobiography, Here's the Story: Surviving Marcia Brady and Finding My True Voice, on October 14, 2008. It debuted at number four on The New York Times bestseller list, where it stayed for three weeks. The book was published by HarperCollins and was acquired by Director of Creative Development Lisa Sharkey. While promoting the book, McCormick was a guest on many news and talk shows such as Access Hollywood, The Howard Stern Show, Good Day L.A., and Paula's Party. The Today Show aired an interview with McCormick about the book rather than switch to a story about the 2008 recession. McCormick said that a film would likely be made about her autobiography.

Also in 2008, she joined the cast of the CMT reality show Gone Country, where she competed for a recording contract. This led to a spin-off reality series called Outsiders Inn, in which she opened a bed and breakfast in Newport, Tennessee. In 2008, McCormick became a spokesperson for Children International. In March 2009, McCormick appeared on Comedy Central's roast of Larry the Cable Guy.

In 2015, McCormick appeared in the Australian version of I'm a Celebrity...Get Me Out of Here!, where she lasted 42 days and was the last evictee before the finale.

On August 30, 2016, McCormick was revealed as one of the celebrities who would compete on season 23 of Dancing with the Stars. She was partnered with professional dancer Artem Chigvintsev. McCormick and Chigvintsev were eliminated on the seventh week of competition and finished in 8th place. She joined with the other surviving main cast members of The Brady Bunch in the 2019 television series A Very Brady Renovation on HGTV.

In 2021, McCormick paired up with contractor/decorator Dan Vickery in HGTV's new series "Frozen in Time", a new home remodeling series.

Biographical portrayals
Kaley Cuoco portrayed Maureen McCormick in Growing Up Brady (2000). McCormick's character Marcia Brady has been portrayed by Christine Taylor in The Brady Bunch Movie (1995) and its sequel A Very Brady Sequel and by Autumn Reeser in the made for TV sequel The Brady Bunch in the White House.

Filmography

Film

Television

Stage credits

Awards and nominations

References

Further reading

External links 

 The Official Maureen McCormick website
 

1956 births
Living people
American child actresses
American film actresses
American musical theatre actresses
American soap opera actresses
American television actresses
American voice actresses
American country singer-songwriters
American women country singers
American people of German descent
American people of Irish descent
Actresses from Los Angeles
Catholics from California
Participants in American reality television series
Reality show winners
People from Encino, Los Angeles
William Howard Taft Charter High School alumni
20th-century American actresses
21st-century American actresses
People from Westlake Village, California
I'm a Celebrity...Get Me Out of Here! (Australian TV series) participants
Singer-songwriters from California